The Glorious Unseen is a Christian rock/contemporary worship band from Nashville, Tennessee. Before signing with BEC Recordings, lead vocalist Ben Crist wrote and played many of the band's songs in his home church, The Anchor Fellowship. The band released their first album, Tonight the Stars Speak, in 2007. Crist got his start in the music industry by performing in the worship band at the Atlanta Vineyard.

History
The Glorious Unseen released their first album, Tonight the Stars Speak, on October 23, 2007 through BEC Recordings. In November 2008, the band then released a digital EP titled The Cries of the Broken.

Their second album, The Hope That Lies In You, was released on August 25, 2009.

Band Changes and a new album
In 2010 lead singer Ben Crist started an internship with the International House of Prayer in Kansas City. The band members went their separate ways when it was clear that he was supposed to stay in Kansas City. Ben is currently still serving at IHOP. In December 2011, Ben Crist let people know through an interview that there would be a new TGU album coming in 2012. The band will be made up of people serving alongside him in Kansas City. During the month of April 2012, Ben Crist ran a fundraiser through the Kickstarter website to help record and release his third album by The Glorious Unseen, titled "Lovesick".

Guitar player Ryan Stubbs released an album titled The Waking Cardinal.

Members

Current members
Ben Crist – vocals, guitar

Former members
Ryan Stubbs – guitar
Ben Harms – bass guitar
Chris Vicari – drums
Adam Smith - keyboard, guitar, trumpet
Patrick Copeland – piano
David Lim – guitar, piano
Adam Wright – guitar formerly of Mortal Treason
Jonathan Todryk - drums
Matt James - drums, guitar

Discography

Studio albums

Studio EPs

References

BuzzGrinder.com's interview with Ben Crist
Tonight The Stars Speak album review

External links
 

Christian rock groups from Tennessee
BEC Recordings artists
Musical groups established in 2007